YSF may refer to:

 Stony Rapids Airport (IATA airport code YSF), Saskatchewan, Canada
 Yousaf Shah Halt railway station (Pakistan Railways code YSF), Pakistan